M-Radio is a Russian Moscow-based radio station. Their logo is a blue capital M with  small, white, feathered wings extending from its sides.

It started broadcasting in 1991 as «M-Radio. New Wave» in Moscow on 71.3 FM.
At the moment it broadcasts to Moscow only on 96.4 FM and via Internet. They play a variety of rock music including Kaiser Chiefs, The Killers, Snow Patrol, U2, and many others.

On October 1, 2015, the radio station began broadcasting in a web radio format. Another attempt at reincarnation belongs to the owners of the brand - the holding company of Igor Krutoy and Mikhail Gutseriev “Krutoy Media”.

External links
 

Radio stations established in 1991
Radio stations disestablished in 2008
Radio stations established in 2015
Radio stations in Russia
Russian-language radio stations
Mass media in Moscow
1991 establishments in Russia
2008 disestablishments in Russia
2015 establishments in Russia
Internet radio stations